Nam Khrai is a village and tambon (sub-district) of Nam Pat District, in Uttaradit Province, Thailand. In 2005 it had a population of 6,065 people. The tambon contains seven villages.

References

Tambon of Uttaradit province
Populated places in Uttaradit province